Jake Hastie (born 18 March 1999) is a Scottish footballer who plays as a winger for Hartlepool United. 

Hastie is a product of the Motherwell academy, and has previously played for Linfield, Motherwell, Airdrieonians, Rangers, Alloa Athletic, Rotherham United and Partick Thistle.

Club career

Motherwell
Raised in Carfin, Hastie joined the Motherwell Youth Academy in 2009. He was selected for the Scotland football team (represented by North Lanarkshire school pupils) at the 2014 International Children's Games alongside Well colleague David Turnbull, who had already been a teammate for several years during their youth careers. On 27 April 2016, Hastie was part of the Motherwell team that won the Scottish Youth Cup, beating Heart of Midlothian 5–2.

On 15 October 2016, Hastie made his senior debut for Motherwell as a substitute in a 2–0 defeat against Celtic. He signed a new two-and-a-half-year deal with Motherwell in January 2017.

In August 2017, he went out on a six-month development loan to Airdrieonians which was subsequently extended until the end of the season. He was loaned to Alloa Athletic in July 2018.

On his first league start for Motherwell on 23 January 2019, with a "slick move", Hastie provided David Turnbull with an assist for the only goal of a win over Hibernian. On 2 February it was the role of Turnbull, via a free kick, to set up a headed goal for Hastie – who also netted the third – in a 3–0 victory over Livingston. Hastie then scored again four days later with the first goal of the match, a "stunning 20-yard drive", as Motherwell defeated St Mirren 2–1, and on 17 February opened the scoring again as his team defeated Hearts at Fir Park by the same scoreline. As his good form drew increasing attention from supporters and the media, he commented that he was an admirer of Gareth Bale and had been studying the Welsh player's moves to improve his game. In March 2019 he won the Scottish Premiership Player of the Month award for February, and was linked with a transfer to a bigger club. Hastie was nominated for the 2018–19 PFA Scotland Young Player of the Year, along with David Turnbull; the award was won by Ryan Kent.

Rangers
On 1 May 2019, Rangers announced that Hastie had agreed a pre-contract with the club, signing a four-year contract with the move to be completed in the coming summer and a compensation payment to be made to Motherwell in recognition of his development at the club, reported as being around £350,000.

Loan to Rotherham United
Hastie was loaned to Rotherham United in September 2019. He scored the opening goal on his debut in the EFL League One match against Doncaster Rovers on 7 September 2019. He was recalled on 28 January 2020.

Return to Motherwell (Loan)
On 3 July 2020, Hastie made a return to Motherwell on a season-long loan deal.

Partick Thistle (loan)
Hastie was loaned to Scottish Championship club Partick Thistle in August 2021. He returned to Rangers in January 2022.

Linfield (loan)
On 29 January 2022 Hastie joined NIFL Premiership side Linfield on loan until the end of the 2021–2022 season.

Hartlepool United
On 24 June 2022, Hastie signed for Hartlepool United

International career
Hastie was selected for the Scotland under-21 squad in March 2019; He made his debut on 22 March.

Career statistics

References

External links
 

1999 births
Living people
Scottish footballers
Association football wingers
Motherwell F.C. players
Airdrieonians F.C. players
Alloa Athletic F.C. players
Rangers F.C. players
Linfield F.C. players
Hartlepool United F.C. players
Scottish Professional Football League players
English Football League players
Footballers from Motherwell
People educated at Braidhurst High School
Scotland under-21 international footballers
Rotherham United F.C. players
Partick Thistle F.C. players